Hacton is a small dispersed settlement in Greater London, England, located within the London Borough of Havering and in East London, and beyond London urban sprawl. Surrounded by the Metropolitan Green Belt, located in the countryside between two London suburban towns (Upminster and Rainham).

History
It was historically a hamlet in the ancient parish of Upminster and is within the Upminster post town. The name means 'farmstead on a hook-shaped piece of land', referring to an area adjacent to the River Ingrebourne.

Population
The Hacton ward of Havering had a population of 12,262 at the 2011 Census.

References

Areas of London
Districts of the London Borough of Havering